Atmakur is a town, municipality, and Mandal headquarters located in Wanaparthy district in the Telangana state of India. Jurala Project is a dam on the Krishna River situated about 18 km from Atmakur. After the proposal of road extension work, Atmakur is rapidly developing.

References

Cities and towns in Wanaparthy district
Mandals in Wanaparthy district